The Winter Triangle is an astronomical asterism formed from three of the brightest stars in the winter sky. It is an imaginary equilateral triangle drawn on the celestial sphere, with its defining vertices at Sirius, Betelgeuse, and Procyon, the primary stars in the three constellations of Canis Major, Orion, and Canis Minor, respectively.

Visibility

For much of the night in the northern winter, the Winter Triangle is high in the sky at mid-northern latitudes, but can also be seen during autumn in the early morning to the East. In the spring the winter triangle is visible early in the evening to the West before its stars set below the horizon. From the southern hemisphere it appears upside down and lower in the sky during the summer months.

The Winter Triangle surrounds most of the faint constellation Monoceros, although its brightest stars are of fourth magnitude and hardly noticeable to the naked eye. The triangle includes two first magnitude stars, while Sirius is even brighter. The other bright stars of the winter sky lie around the triangle: Orion including Rigel; Aldebaran in Taurus; Castor and Pollux in Gemini; and Capella in Auriga.

The stars of the Winter Triangle

See also
 Spring Great Diamond
 Summer Triangle
 Winter Hexagon
 Northern Cross

References

External links
Winter Triangle Night Sky
Deep sky objects inside the Winter Triangle
Winter Triangle at constellation guide
Winter Triangle Jim Kaler's stars

Asterisms (astronomy)